Korten Ridge (‘Kortenski Hrebet’ \'kor-ten-ski 'hre-bet\) is the ridge extending 18 km in south–north direction and 9 km wide, rising to 1864 m (Mount Bris) on Davis Coast in Graham Land, Antarctica.  It is bounded by Podvis Col linking it to Tsarevets Buttress and Detroit Plateau to the southeast, Temple Glacier to the southwest, Lanchester Bay to the west, Wennersgaard Point and Jordanoff Bay to the north, and Sabine Glacier to the east. The north third of the ridge forms Svilengrad Peninsula.

The ridge is named after the settlement of Korten in Southeastern Bulgaria.

Location
German-British mapping in 1996.

Map
 Trinity Peninsula. Scale 1:250000 topographic map No. 5697. Institut für Angewandte Geodäsie and British Antarctic Survey, 1996.

Notes

References
 Korten Ridge. SCAR Composite Antarctic Gazetteer
 Bulgarian Antarctic Gazetteer. Antarctic Place-names Commission. (details in Bulgarian, basic data in English)

External links
 Korten Ridge. Copernix satellite image

Ridges of Graham Land
Bulgaria and the Antarctic
Davis Coast